The following article documents the awards, nominations and accolades received by American singer, songwriter and actress Ashanti.

American Music Awards

|-
|rowspan=6|2003
|rowspan=4|Ashanti
|Favorite Female Artist in Hip-Hop/R&B
|
|-
|Favorite New Artist in Hip-Hop/R&B
|
|-
|Favorite New Artist in Pop/Rock
|
|-
|Fans Choice Award
|
|-
|rowspan=2| Ashanti
|Favorite Album - Pop or Rock 'n Roll Music
|
|-
|Favorite Album - Hip-Hop / Rhythm & Blues Music
|
|}

ASCAP Music Awards

ASCAP Pop Music Awards

|-
|2003
|"Foolish"
|rowspan=2|Award-Winning Pop Songs
|
|-
|2004
|"Rock Wit U (Awww Baby)"
|
|}

ASCAP Rhythm & Soul Music Awards

|-
|rowspan=3|2003
|"Foolish"
|Top R&B/HIP-HOP Song 
|
|-
|"Baby"
|Award-Winning R&B/HIP-HOP Songs 
|
|-
|"Down 4 U"
|Award-Winning Rap Songs
|
|-
|2004
|"Rain On Me"
|Award-Winning R&B/HIP-HOP Songs 
|
|}

BET Awards

|-
|rowspan=2|2002
| Ashanti
|Best New Artist
|
|-
|"Always On Time"
|Viewer's Choice Award
|
|-
|2008
| "The Way That I Love You"
|Video of the Year 
|
|}

Billboard Music Awards

|-
|rowspan=8|2002
|rowspan=7| Ashanti
|Female Artist of the Year
|
|-
|Hot 100 Singles Artist of the Year
|
|-
|R&B/Hip-Hop Artist of the Year
|
|-
|R&B/Hip-Hop Female Artist of the Year
|
|-
|R&B/Hip-Hop Singles Artist of the Year
|
|-
|New R&B/Hip-Hop Artist of the Year
|
|-
|New Pop Artist of the Year
|
|-
|"Foolish"
|R&B/Hip-Hop Single of the Year
|
|-
|2004
|Ashanti
|Female Hot 100 Artist
|
|}

Black Reel Awards

|-
|2005
| "Chicago"
|Best Breakthrough Performance
|
|}

Breckenridge Festival of Film

|-
|2017
| "Stuck"
|Best Actress
|
|}

Brit Awards

|-
|2003
| Ashanti
|Best International Female
|
|}

Grammy Awards

|-
|rowspan=5|2003
|Best New Artist
|Ashanti
|
|-
|Best Contemporary R&B Album
|Ashanti
|
|-
|Best Rap/Sung Collaboration
|"Always on Time"
|
|-
|Best Rap/Sung Collaboration
|"What's Luv"
|
|-
|Best Female R&B Vocal Performance
|"Foolish"
|
|-
|rowspan=3|2004
|Best Female R&B Vocal Performance
|"Rain On Me"
|
|-
|Best R&B Song
|"Rock Wit U (Awww Baby)"
|
|-
|Best Contemporary R&B Album
|Chapter II
|
|}

MTV Europe Music Awards

|-
|2002
|rowspan=2| Ashanti
|rowspan=2| Best R&B 
|
|-
|2003
|
|}

MTV Movie & TV Awards

|-
|2005
|Coach Carter
|Breakthrough Female
|
|}

MTV Video Music Awards 

|-
|rowspan=5| 2002
|rowspan=3| "Foolish"
|Best Female Video
|
|-
|Best New Artist in a Video
|
|-
|Best R&B Video
|
|-
| "What's Luv?"
|rowspan=2|Best Hip-Hop Video
|
|-
|"Always on Time"
|
|-
|2003
|"Rock wit U (Awww Baby)"
|Best R&B Video
|
|}

MTV Video Music Awards Japan

|-
|rowspan=2|2003
|rowspan=2|"Foolish"
|Best New Artist Video
|
|-
|Best R&B Video
|
|-
|2005
|Ashanti
|Best Style
|
|}

MOBO Awards

|-
|rowspan=7|2002
|rowspan=2|Ashanti
|Best R&B Act
|
|-
|Best Newcomer
|
|-
|Ashanti & Ja Rule
|Best Hip Hop Act
|
|-
|rowspan=2|"Always On Time"
|Best Video
|
|-
|rowspan=2|Best Single
|
|-
|"What's Luv"
|
|-
|"Ashanti"
|Best Album
|
|}

MuchMusic Video Awards

|-
|2002
|"Always On Time"
|Best International Video
|
|}

Various wins and nominations
Listed by year, wins are indicated in Bold

2002

Lady of Soul Awards
Best R&B/Soul New Artist 
Aretha Franklin Entertainer of the Year 
Best R&B/Soul Single ("Foolish")
R&B/Soul Album of the Year ("Ashanti")
R&B/Soul Song of the Year ("Foolish")
Best R&B/Soul Music Video ("Foolish")
Teen Choice Awards
Choice Breakout Artist 
Choice R&B/Hip-Hip Single ("Foolish")
Choice Music Collaborations ("Always On Time")
Choice Music Collaborations ("What's Luv")
MOBO Awards
 Best R&B Act
 Best Hip Hop Act (Ashanti with Ja Rule)
Best Newcomer
Best Video ("Always On Time")
Best Album ("Ashanti")
Best Single ("Always On Time")
Best Single ("What's Luv")
MTV Video Music Awards
Best Female Video ("Foolish")
Best R&B Video ("Foolish")
Best New Artist In A Video ("Foolish")
Best Hip-Hop Video ("What's Luv")
Best Hip-Hop Video ("Always On Time")
Fannies (KISS 92 FM) 
Favourite New Artist
Favourite CD ("Ashanti")
Favourite Video ("Always On Time")
Favourite Collaboration ("Always On Time")
Favourite Collaboration ("What's Luv")
Favourite Collaboration ("Down 4 U")
Billboard Music Awards
 Female Artist of the Year
 Top New Pop Artist of the Year
 Hot 100 Singles Artist of the Year
 R&B/Hip-Hop Artist of the Year
 R&B/Hip-Hop Female Artist of the Year
 New R&B/Hip-Hop Artist of the Year
 R&B/Hip-Hop Single of the Year ("Foolish")
 R&B/Hip-Hop Singles Artist of the Year
VH1 Big in 2002 Awards 
Lolita Ford Award
The Z Awards (Z100 New York) 
Favorite New Artist

2003
ASCAP Pop Music Awards
Award-Winning Pop Songs ("Foolish")
ASCAP Rhythm & Soul Music Awards
Top R&B/HIP-HOP Song ("Foolish")
Award-Winning R&B/HIP-HOP Songs ("Baby")
Award-Winning Rap Songs ("Down 4 U")
American Music Awards 
Favorite New Artist in Pop/Rock 
Favorite New Artist in Hip-Hop/R&B 
Fans Choice Award
Favorite Female Artist in Hip-Hop/R&B
Favorite Album - Pop or Rock 'n Roll Music ("Ashanti") 
Favorite Album - Hip-Hop / Rhythm & Blues Music ("Ashanti")
Grammy Awards 
Best New Artist
Best Contemporary R&B Album ("Ashanti") 
Best Female R&B Vocal Performance ("Foolish")
Best Rap/Sung Collaboration ("Always On Time")
Best Rap/Sung Collaboration ("What's Luv")
Soul Train Awards 
Best R&B/Soul Single, Female ("Foolish")
Best R&B/Soul Album, Female ("Ashanti") 
R&B/Soul or Rap Album of the Year ("Ashanti")
BRIT awards
Best international female
NAACP Image Awards 
Outstanding New Artist
Outstanding Female Artist
Nickelodeon Kids Choice Awards 
Favorite Female Singer
DoSomething.org 
Celebrity Service Award
MTV Video Music Awards
Best R&B Video ("Rock Wit U (Awww Baby)")
MTV Video Music Awards (Japan)
Best New Artist in a Video ("Foolish") 
Best R&B Video ("Foolish")

2004
ASCAP Pop Music Awards
Award-Winning Pop Songs ("Rock Wit U (Awww Baby)")
ASCAP Rhythm & Soul Music Awards
Award-Winning R&B/HIP-HOP Songs ("Rain on Me")
Grammy Awards 
Best Female R&B Vocal Performance ("Rain On Me")
Best R&B Song ("Rock Wit U (Awww Baby)"
Best Contemporary R&B Album (Chapter II)
2004 Soul Train Awards 
Best R&B/Soul Single (Female) ("Rain On Me")
Do Something Brick Awards
"Do Something" Brick Award ("Rain on Me")
Source Awards 
R&B Artist of the Year
Billboard Music Awards
Female Hot 100 Artist
Nickelodeon Kids Choice Awards
Favorite Female Singer
First Annual Book Awards 
Songwriter of the year ("Foolish/Unfoolish"/ "Chapter II")

2005
Black Reel Awards 
Best Breakthrough Performance (Coach Carter)
MTV Movie Awards
Breakthrough Female Performance (Coach Carter)
Image Awards 
Outstanding Supporting Actress in a Motion Picture (Coach Carter)
MTV Video Music Awards Japan
Special Category: Style Award
Teen Choice Awards
Choice "It" Girl

2008
BET Awards
Video of the Year ("The Way That I Love You")
Music Choice Awards
Breakup Video of the Year ("The Way That I Love You")
MCP 2008 Year End Award Winners
Best MCP Interview of 2008
Brandy (25.1%)
Michelle Williams (7.5%)
Ashanti (55.5%)
John Legend (6.4%)
Video of the Year
Erykah Badu - Honey (10.4%)
Ashanti - The Way That I Love You (63.0%)
Solange - T.O.N.Y (6.1%)
T-Pain - Can't Believe It (16.3%)
Affiliate of the Year
LeToyaOnline (5.1%)
MonicaSoul (23.2%)
OnlyKeyshia (25.3%)
AshantiDouglas (45.1%)

2010
20th Annual NAACP Theatre Awards
Ashanti Received the 2010 NAACP Theatre Spirit Award

2013
Soul Train Awards
Best Independent R&B/Soul Performance("Never Should Have")

2018
Soul Train Awards
Soul Train Certified Award

Records/Achievements
Guinness Book of World Records
She is most famous for her eponymous debut album Ashanti which featured the hit song "Foolish", and sold 503,000 copies in its first week of release in the US in April 2002, a record-breaking feat. It was the highest first week sales for a female artist's debut ever.
In the same week, she became the first female performer to simultaneously hold the top two places on the Billboard Hot 100 singles chart with "Foolish", and "What's Luv" (with Fat Joe).
She broke records again by having four Top Ten songs (Foolish, What's Luv, Ain't It Funny,and Always on Time (with Ja Rule) on the Billboard Hot 100 charts in the same week. Only The Beatles have achieved this at that time. Then Cardi B achieved this later in 2018, making The Beatles, Ashanti, and Cardi B the only artists to achieve this. Ironically, Ashanti wrote and sang background on the remix of "Ain't It Funny" sung by Jennifer Lopez which was also in the top 10 charts at the same time as "Foolish", "Always on Time" (with Ja Rule), and "What's Luv" (with Fat Joe) so the singer actually had four top 10 singles in the top ten.
According to a report by Billboard.com in 2009, Ashanti has had the most top 10 songs (16 to date) on the R&B/Hip-hop charts by a female for that decade.

In 2002,
Ashanti took home a record 8 billboard awards, winning all the categories she was nominated for.
E!'s 25 Sexiest Women in Entertainment (Ranked: 23) 
FHM-Singapore's 100 Sexiest Women (Ranked: 95) 
Lycos' Top 10 Female Searches (Ranked: 17) 
Lycos' Top 10 Musician Searches for the First Half of 2002 (Ranked: 10) 
Rolling Stone magazine readers picked Ashanti as Best R&B Artist.
She was one Askmen.com's singers of the week Ashanti.

In 2003,
Maxim's 100 Sexiest Women (Ranked: 21) 
E!'s 25 Young Hollywood Stars (Ranked: 14) 
FHM-US's 100 Sexiest Women (Ranked: 76) 
FHM-France's 100 Sexiest Women (Ranked: 82) 
FHM-Netherlands' 100 Sexiest Women (Ranked: 71) 
FHM-Singapore's 100 Sexiest Women (Ranked: 99) 
Status World's Top 100 Female Celebrities (Ranked: 57) 
Spike/TNN 100 Most Irresistible Women (Ranked: 82) 
VH-1's 25 Greatest Rock Star Cameos (Ranked: 18)

In 2004, 
Ashanti was ranked at #63 on VH1's list of The Greatest: 100 Hottest Hotties.
Ashanti became the 1st African-American female to lead a national campaign for Herbal Essence.
FHM-US's 100 Sexiest Women (Ranked: 32) 
FHM-Romania's 100 Sexiest Women (Ranked: 92) 
Maxim's 100 Sexiest Women (Ranked: 29) 
Real Access Top 24 for 2004 (Ranked: 15)

In 2005,
Ashanti ranked at #13 on the Maxim Hot 100 List of 2005.
Ashanti ranked #81 in FHM's "100 Sexiest Women in the World 2005."
BET's All Shades of Fine - 25 Hottest Women of the Past 25 Years (Ranked 14)
Billboard's Top 100 Selling CD's (Ranked: 76) 
Blender Magazine's the Rock Goddess 50 (Ranked: 17) 
FHM-US's 100 Sexiest Women (Ranked: 81) 
Marc's List of Hottest Women (Ranked: 26) 
VH1's 50 Greatest Women of the Video Era (Ranked: 46)
VH1's 100 Most Wanted Bodies (Ranked: 44)

In 2008,
Maxim's 100 Sexiest Women (Ranked: 37)

In 2009,
E!'s 25 Sexiest Pop Stars (Ranked: 19)

References

Ashanti